The Moto E (2020) is an Android smartphone part of the low-end Moto E family of Android smart phones developed by Motorola Mobility. It was presented on June 5, 2020 together with Moto G Fast.

Design
The screen is made of glass. The case is made of plastic.

Below are the micro USB connector, speaker, and microphone. At the top are the second microphone and 3.5 mm audio jack. On the left side, there is a slot for 1 SIM card and a microSD memory card up to 512 GB. On the right side, there are volume buttons and a smartphone lock button. The fingerprint scanner is located on the back panel.

The only available color is Midnight Blue.

Reception
The reception is neutral, saying that it is good for the price and has good battery life. The criticism is mainly on the camera, display, the micro USB port as most Android smartphones have moved to USB-C, and the lack of further software updates.

Technical characteristics

Platform 
The device is powered by the Qualcomm Snapdragon 632 processor and an Adreno 506 GPU.

Battery 
The device has a non-removable 3550 mAh battery.

Cameras 
The device has dual rear-facing cameras consisting of a 13 MP wide sensor and a 2 MP depth sensor, with autofocus. The rear cameras can record video at a resolution of 1080p @ 30fps. The front camera uses a 5 MP sensor.

Screen 
The device has a 6.2-inch IPS LCD 720p display, with a resolution of 1520 × 720 pixels and an aspect ratio of 19:9, with a teardrop-shaped cutout for the front camera.

Memory 
The device is sold with 2 GB RAM and 32 GB of internal storage which can be expanded with microSD.

Software 
The device runs on Android 10. Motorola confirmed that the device will not receive any software updates.

References

Links
Official Site

Android (operating system) devices

Motorola smartphones
Mobile phones introduced in 2020
Mobile phones with multiple rear cameras